Paul-Félix Beuvain de Beauséjour (born 16 December 1839 in Vesoul – 4 April 1930) was a French Catholic clergyman and bishop for the Diocese of Carcassonne-Narbonne. His father Louis-Ernst (1811–1859) is a profession of lawyer and his mother Eugénie, née Fyard de Mercey (1813–1907) is housewife, he has four siblings. He studied at Saint-Sulpice and was ordained a priest on 6 January 1863, serving as a teacher. He was appointed bishop in 1902. He died on 4 April 1930, at the age of 90.

References

19th-century French Roman Catholic bishops
1839 births
1930 deaths
People from Vesoul
20th-century Roman Catholic bishops in France